Raymond Charles "Joe" Kruger (28 February 1935 – 24 July 2003) was a politician in Queensland, Australia. He was a Member of the Queensland Legislative Assembly.

Politics
Joe Kruger was a member of the Pine Rivers Shire Council from 1973 to 1979.

Joe Kruger was elected to the Queensland Legislative Assembly for the Labor Party on 12 November 1977 in the electoral district of Murrumba. He was re-elected in the 1980 and 1983 elections. He was not pre-selected by the ALP for the 1986 election. He ran as an independent, but lost the seat to Dean Wells.

References

1935 births
2003 deaths
Members of the Queensland Legislative Assembly
Australian Labor Party members of the Parliament of Queensland
20th-century Australian politicians